Neusiedl an der Zaya is a town in the district of Gänserndorf in the Austrian state of Lower Austria.

Geography
Neusiedl an der Zaya lies in the hills of the northeast Weinviertel about 10 km west of Hohenau an der March. About 17.27 percent of the municipality is forested.

See also 
 Zaya

References

Cities and towns in Gänserndorf District